Fiction Illustrated is a short-lived series of early illustrated fiction, similar to graphic novels, produced and packaged by Byron Preiss Visual Productions in the 1970s and published by Pyramid/Jove/HBJ. Four were produced, with a fifth was planned. All but one were written by Byron Preiss. The first three were published digest size, the fourth was published in larger format.

Volumes
 Fiction Illustrated #1—Schlomo Raven: Public Detective (Pyramid Books, 1976; by Preiss and Tom Sutton)
 Fiction Illustrated #2—Starfawn (Pyramid Books, 1976; by Preiss and Stephen Fabian)
 Fiction Illustrated #3—Chandler: Red Tide (Pyramid Books, 1976 ; Dark Horse Comics, 2001 )
 Fiction Illustrated #4—Son of Sherlock Holmes (Pyramid Books, 1977; by Preiss and Ralph Reese)

Follow-ons
 Dragonworld (planned to be the fifth volume), Preiss and Michael Reaves, illustrated by Joseph Zucker.
 Doubleday hardcover, 1979
 Bantam / Dell paperback, 1979) 
 Spectra paperback (July 1983) 
 Bantam / Dell paperback (Aug. 1983) 
 iBooks, Inc. paperback (2000) 
 iBooks, Inc. ebook (Microsoft Reader; 2001)
 iBooks, Inc. paperback (2002) 
 iBooks, Inc. paperback (2005) 
 Alfred Bester's The Stars My Destination as a planned two-volume graphic novel, illustrated by Howard Chaykin, Putnam/Berkley, 1978. Volume two never published, Complete published by Epic Comics, xx.
 Samuel R. Delany's Empire, illustrated by Howard Chaykin, Putnam/Berkley, 1978. /
 The Illustrated Roger Zelazny, illustrated by Gray Morrow, Baronet, 1978, Ace Books, 1979. 

Series of books
American graphic novels
1970s books